"Satellite" is a song by American rock band The Hooters, which was released in 1987 as the second single from their third studio album One Way Home. The song was written by Rob Hyman, Eric Bazilian and Rick Chertoff, and produced by Chertoff. "Satellite" reached No. 61 on the US Billboard Hot 100 and No. 22 on the UK Singles Chart.

Background
"Satellite" takes a satirical look at Televangelism. Hyman told Simon Mayo for the Reading Evening Post in 1987: "They're a strange combination of religious concepts and satellite technology both up there in the heavens. It's all very political because to get your programmes on the satellite you need influence, money and power. The programmes are supposed to be non profit making but recent exposés have uncovered loads of financial scandals. Our song is very timely!"

Music video
The song's music video was directed by David Hogan and produced by Daniel Stewart for Limelight Productions. It achieved active rotation on MTV.

Critical reception
On its release, Billboard described the song as a "traditionally styled rock number". Cash Box considered the song a "driving pop/rock" track that "should continue" the band's success in the Top 40 and on AOR radio. Music & Media wrote, "Captivating and epic piece of rock with folk overtones through an accordion and a Big Country type of lick." In a review of One Way Home, David Fricke of Rolling Stone described the song as a "powerful pop KO of TV pulpit pounders", with its "core riff" being "a metallic jig figure – sort of Boston meets John Barleycorn – fattened up with iron-fist guitar chords and Close Encounters synth effects".

Track listing
7" single
"Satellite" - 3:50
"One Way Home" - 5:33

7" single (US promo)
"Satellite" (LV) - 4:18
"Satellite" (SV) - 3:50

12" and CD single
"Satellite" - 4:18
"One Way Home" - 5:33
"All You Zombies" - 5:58

Personnel
The Hooters
 Eric Bazilian - lead vocals, guitar
 Rob Hyman - keyboards, accordion, melodica
 Andy King - bass guitar, backing vocals
 John Lilley - guitar
 David Uosikkinen - drums

Production
 Rick Chertoff - producer
 Rob Hyman, Eric Bazilian - co-producers
 Dave Thoener, Rod O'Brien, Phil Nicolo - engineers
 Teddy Trewhella, Frank Pekoc, Joe Henehan - assistant engineers
 George Marino - mastering

Charts

References

1987 songs
1987 singles
American pop rock songs
The Hooters songs
Columbia Records singles
CBS Records singles
Parodies of televangelism
Satirical songs
Songs written by Rob Hyman
Songs written by Eric Bazilian
Songs written by Rick Chertoff
Song recordings produced by Rick Chertoff